Koyla is a union parishad under Kalaroa Upazila, Satkhira District, in the Division of Khulna, southwest part of Bangladesh.

References

Unions of Kalaroa Upazila
Unions of Satkhira District